1951 Lick, provisional designation , is a rare-type asteroid and Mars-crosser, approximately 5.6 kilometers in diameter. It was discovered on 26 July 1949, by American astronomer Carl Wirtanen at Lick Observatory on the summit of Mount Hamilton, California, and named for American philanthropist James Lick.

Orbit 

The asteroid orbits the Sun at a distance of 1.3–1.5 AU once every 20 months (599 days). Its orbit has an eccentricity of 0.06 and an inclination of 39° with respect to the ecliptic. Licks observation arc begins with its discovery observation, as no precoveries were taken, and no prior identifications were made.

Physical characteristics

Spectral type 

In the SMASS taxonomic scheme, Licks spectral type is that of a rare A-type asteroid with a surface consisting of almost pure olivine. As of 2016, only 17 minor planets of this type are known.

Rotation period 

In July 2008, a rotational lightcurve was obtained from photometric by astronomer Brian D. Warner at his Palmer Divide Observatory in Colorado, United States. It gave a well-defined rotation period of 5.2974 hours with a brightness variation of 0.25 in magnitude. Several lightcurves with a lower or unassessed quality have been obtained by astronomers Wiesław Z. Wiśniewski and Petr Pravec in the 1980s and 1990s. The most recent observation by Michael Lucas in February 2011, gave a period of 5.317 hours with an amplitude of 0.33 magnitude.

Diameter and albedo 

According to 3 observations taken by the Infrared Astronomical Satellite IRAS, Lick measures 5.57 kilometers in diameter and its surface has an albedo of 0.09. The Collaborative Asteroid Lightcurve Link agrees with the results obtained by IRAS and derives an albedo of 0.10 and a diameter of 5.59 kilometers with an absolute magnitude of 14.35.

Naming 

Lick was named in honor of James Lick (1796–1876), American philanthropist and the founder of the discovering Lick Observatory of the University of California. He is also honored by a lunar crater Lick. The official  was published by the Minor Planet Center on 20 February 1976.

Notes

References

External links 
 Lightcurve plot of 1951 Lick, Palmer Divide Observatory, B. D. Warner (2008)
 Asteroid Lightcurve Database (LCDB), query form (info )
 Dictionary of Minor Planet Names, Google books
 Asteroids and comets rotation curves, CdR – Observatoire de Genève, Raoul Behrend
 Discovery Circumstances: Numbered Minor Planets (1)-(5000) – Minor Planet Center
 
 

001951
Discoveries by Carl A. Wirtanen
Named minor planets
001951
19490726